KMSS may refer to:

 KMSS-TV, a television station (channel 33 analog/34 digital) licensed to Shreveport, Louisiana, United States
 Massena International Airport in Massena, New York, United States